David Eastburn Farm is a historic farm located near Newark, New Castle County, Delaware. The property includes eight contributing buildings: a frame bank barn (c. 1825), a stone dwelling (c. 1850), a stone tenant house possibly dating to the 18th century, and five outbuildings.  The dwelling is a three-story, double pile, stuccoed stone building with a pyramidal roof crowned by a flat-roofed belvedere.  It has a two-story, hip-roofed rear wing.

It was added to the National Register of Historic Places in 1986.

References

External links

Farms on the National Register of Historic Places in Delaware
Houses completed in 1800
Houses in New Castle County, Delaware
National Register of Historic Places in New Castle County, Delaware